Léon Jean (25 January 1901, in Lunel-Viel – 12 December 1986) was a French politician. He represented the French Section of the Workers' International (SFIO) in the National Assembly from 1951 to 1955.

References

1901 births
1986 deaths
People from Hérault
Politicians from Occitania (administrative region)
French Section of the Workers' International politicians
Deputies of the 2nd National Assembly of the French Fourth Republic
French military personnel of World War II